Aziz Mahmud Hudayi (1541–1628), (b. Şereflikoçhisar, d. Üsküdar), is amongst the most famous Sufi Muslim saints of the Ottoman Empire. He was the third and last husband of Ayşe Hümaşah Sultan, granddaughter of Sultan Suleiman the Magnificent. He was a mystic, poet, composer, author, statesman and Hanafi Maturidi Islamic scholar.

Life
Born of Hashemite ancestry in Şereflikoçhisar in Central Anatolia, Aziz Mahmud Hudayi completed his studies in a medrese in Istanbul. He became the Sheikh of Sultan Ahmed I who constructed the famous Blue Mosque and so read the first Friday prayer there on its opening. He was also especially respected by Sultan Murad III. He is a descendant of Junayd of Baghdad, and, as a descendant of Husayn ibn 'Ali, can be called a sayyid.  

He founded the Jelveti (Turkish: Celveti) order of sufis and served as a qadi (Islamic judge) in Edirne, Egypt, Sham (Syria), and Bursa. A murid (disciple) and khalifah (successor) of Üftade Hazretleri of Bursa, he wrote about thirty works, seven of them in Turkish. Mustafa Gaibi, a prominent sufi from Ottoman Bosnia, was one of his disciples. 

His following supplication prompted many sailors of the Ottoman Navy to visit his grave before going out to sea:  

He died in Üsküdar, Istanbul and is buried in a mausoleum, that is a popular tourist destination. The small stone house where he lived is a few miles away from the mausoleum. The 19th-century Üsküdar-born artist Hoca Ali Riza painted a watercolour of the house standing alone in what was then countryside. A foundation named after him now maintains the house which has become the Çilehane Mescid overlooked by the large new Çilehane Cami.

Four Patron Saints of the Bosphorus
Along with Yahya Efendi, Telli Baba, and Joshua, Aziz Mahmud Hudayi is considered to be one of the Four Patron Saints of the Bosphorus.

See also
Mustafa Devati, a successor

References

1541 births
1628 deaths
Üsküdar
Ottoman Sufis
Turkish Sufis
16th-century Muslim theologians
17th-century Muslim theologians
Sufi saints from the Ottoman Empire
Muslim saints
Poets from the Ottoman Empire
Composers of Ottoman classical music
Composers of Turkish makam music
Hanafis
Maturidis
Islamic scholars from the Ottoman Empire